Juan Antonio Zamora Zambudio (born 3 May 1983 in Murcia) is a Spanish professional footballer who plays as a right back or a central defender.

External links

1983 births
Living people
Footballers from Murcia
Spanish footballers
Association football defenders
La Liga players
Segunda División players
Segunda División B players
Tercera División players
Real Madrid C footballers
FC Cartagena footballers
Real Murcia Imperial players
Real Murcia players
Girona FC players
CD Castellón footballers
AD Ceuta footballers
CD Badajoz players
Recreativo de Huelva players